Monopis icterogastra, the wool moth, is a moth of the family Tineidae. It is found in most of Australia.

It is thought that the moths of this species lay live young caterpillars rather than eggs.

References

Tineinae
Moths of Australia
Moths described in 1852